Robin Hood of El Dorado is a 1936 American Western film directed by William A. Wellman for MGM. It stars Warner Baxter as real-life Mexican folk hero Joaquin Murrieta and Ann Loring as his love interest, with Bruce Cabot as Bill Warren and J. Carrol Naish as Murrietta's notorious partner, Three-Fingered Jack. The film is based on the life of Murrietta as the Robin Hood of Old California in 1850, a kind, gentle man who is driven to violence.

Plot summary

In 1848 in California, Mexican farmer Joaquin Murietta has become a criminal to avenge the rape and murder of his wife Rosita and lynching of his brother Jose at the hands of the Americans.

Cast
Warner Baxter as Joaquin Murrietta
Ann Loring as Juanita de la Cuesta
Bruce Cabot as Bill Warren
Margo as Rosita
J. Carrol Naish as Three-Fingered Jack
Soledad Jiménez as Madre Murrietta
Carlos de Valdez as Jose Murrietta
Eric Linden as Johnnie Warren
Edgar Kennedy as Sheriff Judd
Charles Trowbridge as Ramon de la Cuesta
Harvey Stevens as Captain Osborne
Ralph Remley as Judge Perkins
George Regas as Tomas
Harry Woods as Pete
Francis McDonald as Pedro the Spy
Kay Hughes as Louise
Paul Hurst as Wilson
Boothe Howard as Tablard

Notes
The screenplay was written by the actor Joseph Calleia, Melvin Levy and William A. Wellman, with assistance by Robert Carson. In 1937, Wellman and Carson won an Academy Award for Best Screenplay for A Star Is Born. The Robin Hood of El Dorado was based on the biography of Joaquin Murrieta by Walter Noble Burns and was MGM's attempt to follow Viva Villa!.

Film historian Frank T. Thompson writes that "Wellman made a stronger statement on the subject of racism than a whole spate of later films (like Gentleman's Agreement)."

The Robin Hood of El Dorado also anticipates the revisionist westerns of the 1960s, especially The Wild Bunch (1969), directed by Sam Peckinpah. Both films mix violence and sentimentality with an undercurrent of regret for a vanishing way of life. The Mexican folk song "La golondrina" is used to similar effect.

Art director David Townsend was killed in a car accident while scouting locations for the film.

Crew
David Townsend, art director
Dolly Tree, costume designer

References

External links

1936 Western (genre) films
1936 films
American black-and-white films
Films directed by William A. Wellman
Films scored by Herbert Stothart
Metro-Goldwyn-Mayer films
American Western (genre) films
1930s English-language films
1930s American films